Chara is a rural locality (a selo) and the administrative center of Kalarsky District of Zabaykalsky Krai, Russia, located on the Chara River at an elevation of  above sea level. Population:

Geography

Climate
Chara has a subarctic climate (Köppen climate classification Dwc), with long, bitterly cold winters and warm, mild summers. Precipitation is quite low but is much higher in summer than at other times of the year.

Transportation
It is served by the Chara Airport.

References

Rural localities in Zabaykalsky Krai